Rajib Boro (born 10 March 1994) is an Indian footballer who plays as a midfielder for NF Railway's football team.

Career

ONGC
Boro made his debut for ONGC F.C. of the I-League on 23 September 2012 during the 2012 Indian Federation Cup against East Bengal F.C. in which ONGC lost 2–1.

Post ONGC
After ONGC were relegated from the I-League, Boro went to Assam where he represented Railways in the 2014 Santosh Trophy. With Railways, Boro made it to the final against Mizoram. He did not get to play in the match due to suspension and Mizoram eventually came out on top 3–0. He also joined the Northeast Frontier Railway (NF Railway) football team and participated with the side in various competitions.

I-League statistics

References

Indian footballers
1994 births
Living people
I-League 2nd Division players
I-League players
ONGC FC players
Association football midfielders
Footballers from Assam